FFHG Division 1 (Fédération Française de Hockey sur Glace Division 1 or French Ice Hockey Federation Division 1) is a semi-professional ice hockey league in France. It is the second of four levels of national ice hockey in France. The teams that end at the bottom of the table get relegated to FFHG Division 2 while the top get promoted to Ligue Magnus.

2021/22 Teams 
FFHG Division 1 consists of 14 teams.

Season 
During the regular season, each team plays each of the other teams twice: once at home and once away (26 games). In the event of a tie at the end of three periods, one 10-minute overtime period is played based sudden-death rules. If the game is still tied after this period, the teams proceed to a shoot-out to determine a winner.

At the end of this regular season the eight highest-ranking teams enter a series of play-offs. In order to be promoted to the division above (the Ligue Magnus), the winner of the Division 1 play-offs then plays a best-of-three series against the losing team that division. The winning team of that series then qualifies for play in Ligue Magnus the following season, while the losing team stays in (or is relegated to) Division 1.

The four lowest-ranking teams also enter a play-off series in which the losing teams continue, and the overall losing team must play (and win) a best-of-three series against the champion of the FFHG Division 2 in order to avoid being relegated.

Champions

References

External links 
 FFHG Division 1 Official Site

 
Fra
Professional ice hockey leagues in France